is a Japanese actor. Internationally, he is best known for his leading roles as Shuya Nanahara in the Battle Royale films, Light Yagami in the Death Note films, Kaiji Itō in the Kaiji films, and Rikuhiko Yuki in Hideo Nakata's The Incite Mill. In 2014, he portrayed the villain Shishio Makoto in the live action Rurouni Kenshin films.

Early life
Born in Chichibu, Saitama Prefecture, Fujiwara has had an interest in acting from a young age. In 2013, he married his long-term girlfriend.  In the summer of 2016, they became parents. The name and gender of their child is unknown.

Career

He is famous for acting the part of Shuya Nanahara in Kinji Fukasaku's controversial 2000 film Battle Royale. He continues the character as a leader of the "Wild Seven" in the sequel, Battle Royale II: Requiem.

He stars as Light Yagami, the leading role in Death Note and Death Note: The Last Name, films based on the manga of the same name. He also has a cameo appearance in L: Change the World, an L spin-off movie for the Death Note series. Fujiwara stated during filming that it was difficult to portray a character with such restrained emotions. During the filming of Death Note: The Last Name, Tatsuya became close friends with Kenichi Matsuyama, who plays L. Matsuyama mentioned that Tatsuya had done a good job.

In theatrical works, he is known for collaborating with Yukio Ninagawa, one of the most influential directors in Japan. He started his career in theatre, before his screen debut, with the title role of Shintoku-maru, the boy who has an obsessive relationship with his step mother. He has also acted in Shakespeare plays, including Hamlet and Romeo and Juliet. Fujiwara played one of the lead roles in Hideo Nakata's psychological thriller film The Incite Mill. Fujiwara has also done voice dubbing for IRIS along with Meisa Kuroki, Yuu Shirota and his Death Note co-star Hikari Mitsushima when  Fujiwara plays Kim Hyun-jun played by Lee Byung-hun

He  portrayed  the role of Shishio Makoto in the sequels of Rurouni Kenshin in 2014. After that, he is scheduled to play the role in Taiwan in March and at Barbican Theatre in May 2015.

Hidayah Idris wrote in the Singapore edition of the magazine Cleo that Fujiwara is "probably one of the most recognisable Japanese stars" in Singapore.

Filmography

Films
 Kamen Gakuen (2000) - Akira Dojima
 Battle Royale (2000) - Shuya Nanahara
 Sabu (2002) - Eiji
 Battle Royale II: Requiem (2003) - Shuya Nanahara
 Moonlight Jellyfish (2004) - Seiji Terasawa
 Death Note (2006) - Light Yagami
 Death Note 2: The Last Name (2006) - Light Yagami
 L: Change the World (2008) (cameo) - Light Yagami
 Chameleon (2008) - Gorō Noda
 Snakes and Earrings (2008)
 Zen (2009) - Hojo Tokiyori
 Kaiji (2009) - Kaiji Itō
 Parade (2009) - Naoki Ihara
 The Incite Mill (2010)
 You Dance With The Summer (2010) - Shiro Takaki
 The Borrower Arrietty (2010) - Spiller (voice)
 Kaiji 2 (2011) - Kaiji Itō
 Okaeri Hayabusa (2012) - Kento Ohashi
 I'm Flash! (2012)
 Wara no Tate (2013) - Kunihide Kiyomaru
 In His Chart 2 (2014) - Dr. Tatsuya Shindo
 Sanbun no Ichi (2014) - Shu
 Monsterz (2014)
 Rurouni Kenshin: Kyoto Inferno (2014) - Shishio Makoto
 Rurouni Kenshin: The Legend Ends (2014) - Shishio Makoto
 ST 'Scientific Task Force' Aka to Shiro no Sosa File - The Movie (2015)
 Pokémon the Movie: Hoopa and the Clash of Ages (2015) - Barza (voice)
 Erased (2016) - Satoru Fujinuma 
 Death Note: Light Up the New World (2016) - Light Yagami
 Memoirs of a Murderer (2017) - Sonezaki
 Million Dollar Man (2018)
 The Miracle of Crybaby Shottan (2018)
 Diner (2019)
 No Longer Human (2019) - Ango Sakaguchi
 Lupin the Third: The First (2019) - Gerard (voice)
 Kaiji: Final Game (2020) - Kaiji Itō
 The Sun Stands Still (2021) - Kazuhiko Takano
 Every Trick in the Book (2021) - Shin'ichi Tsuda
 Noise (2022) - Keita Izumi

Television
 That's the Answer (1997)
 Cyber Bishōjo Telomere (1998)
 Feeling Relief Is Easy (1998)
 Frozen Summer (1998)
 Change! (1998)
 LxIxVxE (1999)
 Kiss of Heaven (1999)
 The Things You Taught Me (2000)
 Saintly Springtime of Life (2001)
 Ikutsumono Umi o Koeru Te (2001)
 Heaven's Coins 3 (2001)
 I Cannot Say I Love You (2002)
 Night of Being Concerned (2002)
 Ai Gorin (2003)
 Shinsengumi! (2004) - Okita Sōji
 Yatsuhakamura (2004)
 Red Doubt (2005)
 SunLight (2005)
 Furuhata Ninzaburo (2006)
 Sengoku Jieitai: Sekigahara no Tatakai (2006)
 Tokyo Daikushu (2008)
 Ojiichan wa 25-sai (2010)
 Wagaya no Rekishi (2010) - Osamu Tezuka
 Piece Vote (2011) - Yu Wakitan
 ST 'Scientific Task Force' Keishichou Kagaku Tokusouhan (2013)
 ST 'Scientific Task Force' Aka to Shiro no Sosa File (2014)
 Sherlock Holmes (2014) - Windibank and Hosmar Angel
 Lost ID (2016) - Shinichi Todo
 Moribito: Guardian of the Spirit (2016) - The Emperor
 Reverse (2017) - Kazuhisa Fukase
 The Sun Stands Still: The Eclipse (2020) - Kazuhiko Takano
 Nakamura Nakazo: Shusse no Kizahashi (2021)

Video games
 Yakuza 3 (2009) - Rikiya Shimabukuro
 Yakuza 6: The Song of Life (2016) - Yuta Usami

Japanese dub
 Stuart Little film series (2000) - Stuart Little (voiceover for Michael J. Fox)
 The Emperor's New Groove (2001) - Emperor Kuzco (voiceover for David Spade)
 Independence Day: Resurgence (2016) - Jake Morrison (voiceover for Liam Hemsworth)
 Iris - Kim Hyun-jun (voiceover for Lee Byung-hun)

References

External links
  
 Tatsuya Fujiwara on NHK Archives 
 Fansite "Rising Dragon Tatsuya Fujiwara"
 

1982 births
Actors from Saitama Prefecture
Japanese male film actors
Japanese male television actors
Japanese male video game actors
Japanese male voice actors
Living people
20th-century Japanese male actors
21st-century Japanese male actors